Gija, also spelt Gidja and Kija, alternatively known as the Lungga, refers to Aboriginal Australians from the East Kimberley area of Western Australia, about 200 km south of Kununurra. In the late 19th century pastoralists were fiercely resisted by Gija people, many of whom now live around localities such as Halls Creek and Warmun (also known as Turkey Creek).

Language
Gija does not belong to the Pama-Nyungan language family which covers most Australian aboriginal tongues, but is a member of the small Jarrakan language group. It is still spoken by from 100 to 200 people.

Country
The Gija's traditional territory consisted of an estimated . On Salmond, Chamberlain, and Wilson rivers. The western boundary ran up to the foothills of the Bluff Face Range. They also lived and hunted around the upper Margaret River, above the Ramsay Range gorge. Their easternmost lands ran as far as Halls Creek and Alice Downs. Sites associated with the Gija are Macphee Creek, as far north as Sugarloaf Hill, the Durack Range, Lissadell and Turkey Creek Station, Fig Tree Pool and the headwaters of Stony River.

History of contact
The last known massacre of the Gija people took place at Bedford Downs Station in 1924, when, according to Gija tradition, Paddy Quilty and others at the Bedford station took tribesmen off the station and fed them food laced with strychnine. The corpses of those they killed were then heaped up and burnt on a funeral pyre to eliminate traces of the deed.

Modern period
In 1979, mining explorations teams discovered pink and reddish diamonds, quite rare at the time, at Smoke Creek and at Barramundi Gap, a key site in Gija female dreaming. Subsequently the Argyle diamond mine was established. Employment of local people remained low, 10% in 2003, when strategies changed. Now a quarter of the workforce is recruited from local indigenous people.

The Gija have maintained a strong tradition of cultural preservation and active programs include a repository of teaching materials and artwork. Qantas adapted Paddy Bedford's artwork for use on a Boeing 737.

Notable people
 Paddy Bedford (1922-2007), Gija artist
 Josie Farrer, Australian parliamentarian. Member of the Legislative Assembly of Western Australia since 2013, representing the seat of Kimberley.
Stacy Mader, the first Aboriginal Australian to obtain a PhD in astronomy.
 Lena Nyadbi, Gija artist whose works on barramundi scale designs have been exhibited in Paris, notable on the roof of the Musee du Quai Branly, and only viewable from the Eiffel Tower. The work was commissioned by the Museum; Nyadbi's design represents the dreaming story of the barramundi, eluding capture to shed its scales across the landscape. The scales are metaphors for the pink Argyle diamonds, now mined by Rio Tinto on Gija land. With the positioning on the rooftop, Nyadbi's intent was to have the barramundi appear poised to flip back into the Seine.

Notes

Citations

Sources

External links 
 Bibliography of Kija people and language resources, at the Australian Institute of Aboriginal and Torres Strait Islander Studies

Aboriginal peoples of Western Australia
Kimberley (Western Australia)